The Yanga people, also spelt Jangaa, Janggal, Janga, and Yangaa, were an Aboriginal Australian people of the state of Queensland. They may be the same as the Yukulta / Ganggalida / Nyangga group. They are not to be confused with the Yangga.

Country
Their western limits were at Glenora. Starting from the headwaters of the Gilbert River, these lands extended south of Forsayth as far as Gilberton and the Gregory Range. Their eastern boundary lay near Oak Park, Percyville,
and the headwaters of the Copperfield River.

Language

The Yanga people spoke the Yanga language, which is mutually intelligible with Mbara. Yanga may be the same as the same language as Ganggalida/Yukulta.

Social organisation
According to Tindale, the Yanga were divided into kin groups, of which one at least is known:
 Purkaburra, resident at Percyville.

Alternative names
 Purkaburra

Notes

Citations

Sources

Aboriginal peoples of Queensland